Armenian International Airways (AIA) was a privately owned airline operating international passenger flights based from Zvartnots International Airport in Yerevan, Armenia.

History
Armenian International Airways was jointly established on 12 July 2002, by Armenian businessmen Gagik Tsarukian, Versand Hakobyan, Hrair Hakobyan, and Levon Baghdasarian. AIA initially intended to lease three Airbus aircraft by 2003 for flights to Paris, Amsterdam, and Frankfurt. On 1 January 2005, the company merged with Armavia.

Routes 
AIA operated scheduled flights from Yerevan to Western Europe, notably many former Armenian Airlines routes.

Fleet

AIA operated one leased Airbus A320-200. This aircraft was destroyed in a fire at Brussels Airport on 5 May 2006, along with one of Armavia's own A320s.

References

External links

Defunct airlines of Armenia
Airlines established in 2002
Airlines disestablished in 2005
2005 disestablishments in Armenia
Armenian companies established in 2002